is an early hentai series. The first Cream Lemon OVA was released in August 1984, though Cream Lemon was not the first hentai OVA. The first was Lolita Anime, released earlier in February 1984. Patrick W. Galbraith writes that Cream Lemon was "was by far the longest running and most influential" hentai series in the 1980s and "laid the foundation for pornographic animation in Japan".

Related to Cream Lemon is the Project A-ko franchise, which was meant to be the third installment of Cream Lemon but changed during production to be a mainstream film. The only remaining indication is the bath scene with B-ko. Adult entertainment company Excalibur Films dubbed, edited, and released in English five Cream Lemon OVAs as parts two and three of their three-volume Brothers Grime X-Rated Cartoons series in 1987 and 1989. In 1987, Brazilian distributor Everest Video licensed the series and released much of it on VHS, in uncensored form.

Plot
Cream Lemon is a collection of sometimes surreal stories having different settings and situations, with genres including fantasy, comedy, suspense, sci-fi, action, drama, mecha, magical girl, horror, and mystery. The overriding theme of the series is sex of almost any kind imaginable. Most chapters stand alone as separate titles, having no relation to any other stories within the Cream Lemon series. The main recurring character is Ami Nonomura, who has an incestuous relationship with her step-brother Hiroshi.

Cream Lemon often focuses on unrealistic and exaggerated sexual themes. One example is the story of a teenage girl who does not like having sex because of a series of rapes in her family. To cure this, the school counselor orders her to strip in front of the art class and masturbate herself to the point of orgasm. She then has public sex with a boy and likes it, causing the whole class to start having sex. Many others are similarly surreal.

Media

Cream Lemon

Cream Lemon Omnibus

New Cream Lemon

Ami: From Then On
The Ami: From Then On OVAs are an alternate ending to the Ami series, replacing the 1986 theatrical short film Going on a Journey: Ami Final Chapter.

Manga Artist series
Due to the moral panic after the arrest of Tsutomu Miyazaki, three episodes of this series besides "Magic City Astalot" had sex scenes removed and were released as "The VHS Series". Later, the uncensored works were released as "full versions".

Miscellaneous specials

New Century Cream Lemon
After eight years, the first in a brief new age of Cream Lemon OVAs made its appearance, with another following the year after. The episodes are connected to the "Escalation" and "Ami" series.

Non-pornographic animation
A music video, Ami Image -White Shadow-, as well as a feature film, Going on a Journey -Ami Final Chapter-, were released in 1985 and 1986, respectively.
Going on a Journey -Ami Final Chapter- was screened as a double feature alongside Project A-ko. They were bundled onto a single LaserDisc set released by Pony Canyon on September 21, 1986.

An OVA series titled Cream Lemon: New Generation was released in 2006.

Ami Image/Journey

Cream Lemon: New Generation

Live-action
On March 21, 1997, a live-action video based on the Escalation series was released under the title Cream Lemon Escalation: Angel Wings.

A romantic live action movie titled Cream Lemon, loosely based on the Ami series, was released in Japanese theaters on September 25, 2004. It was directed by Nobuhiro Yamashita, with Chiharu Muraishi as Ami and Kenji Mizuhashi as Hiroshi.

A nine-episode erotic V-Cinema (direct-to-video) series, Cream Lemon Label, focusing on forbidden brother-sister relationships, was released from September 16, 2005, to March 28, 2008, with the last episode also being released in theaters on February 23, 2008.

Video games

Re-releases
Green Bunny distributed the Cream Lemon OVAs across eighteen DVD sets from October 25, 1999, to August 25, 2000. AMG Entertainment released a single DVD box set on April 20, 2007.

Voice actors
Ami series
Hitomi Oikawa as Ami Nonomura
Nobuo Tobita as Hiroshi Nonomura
Natsumi Sasaki as Satomi Kudō
Arisa Andou as Kyōko Terasawa
Narumi Tsunoda as Yasuko Nonomura & Kyōko Hori
Kouichi Hashimoto as Ryūji Kōno
Escalation series
Narumi Tsunoda as Naomi Hayakawa
Arisa Andou as Rie Komatsuzaki
Natsumi Sasaki as Midori Ōmori
Hitomi Oikawa as Teacher
Miki Itou as Mari
Ikuya Sawaki as Naomi's father
Naoko Matsui as Arisa Kuriki
Rall series
Sanae Miyuki as Caron
Daisuke Gouri as Ramorue
Seiko Nakano as Peruru
Arisa Andou as Yulia
Nobuo Tobita as Raike
Kae Araki as Sara
Pop Chaser
Kaori Hanai as Rio
Makoto Kōsaka (Yoshie Takaishi) as Mai
Yuji Osada as Bartender
Yasu Sato as Zack
Mako series
Mayumi Shou & Miki Itou as Mako Kiryū
Shigeru Nakahara as Yū
Masako Miura as Free & Repress
Hitomi Oikawa as Friend C
Narumi Tsunoda as Friend
Super Virgin
Arisa Andou as Mako
Aya Mizoguchi as Iiya Ōane
Hiroyuki Shibamoto as Tamaki
Happening Summer
Hirotaka Suzuoki as Akira
Maria Kawamura as Keiko
Naoko Matsui as Yuki
Minako Arakawa as Etsuko Aoki
Star Trap
Chieko Honda as Ran
Sanae Miyuki as Kanata
Kouichi Hashimoto as Joke Tōgō
Black Cat Manor series
Arisa Andou as Marisa Ayukawa
Yuuichi Meguro as Masaki Murakami
Yoshino Ohtori as Saeko Ayukawa
Aya Mizoguchi as Aya Ōmuro
Nalice Scramble
Chieko Honda as Narisu Madogiwa
Kenichi Ogata as Principal Madogiwa
Emi Shinohara as Rami Ichimonji
Aya Mizoguchi as An Koshi & Kyan Hitomi
Yumi Takada as Seiko Madogiwa

Reception
AVN reviewed volumes two and three of the Brothers Grime X-Rated Cartoons series.

Notes

References

McCarthy, Helen and Jonathan Clements. The Erotic Anime Movie Guide.  London: Titan Books, 1998.  .  (Woodstock, NY: Overlook Press, 1999.  .)  Chapter 5 covers Cream Lemon in detail.

External links
Cream Lemon official site 
Official episode list 

1984 anime OVAs
1985 anime OVAs
1986 anime OVAs
1987 anime OVAs
1988 anime OVAs
1989 anime OVAs
1990 anime OVAs
1992 anime OVAs
1993 anime OVAs
2001 anime OVAs
2006 anime OVAs
Japanese adult animated films
Hentai anime and manga
Incest in anime and manga